Wettingen is a railway station in the municipality of Wettingen in the Swiss canton of Aargau. The station is located on the Zürich to Baden main line, just west of the point where the Furttal line joins the main line.

The station is served by services S6, S12 and S19 of the Zurich S-Bahn.

References

External links 

Railway stations in the canton of Aargau
Swiss Federal Railways stations
Railway stations in Switzerland opened in 1876